Sukhothai was the capital of the Sukhothai Kingdom. Sukhothai is 12 km west of the modern city of Sukhothai Thani.

History
Sukhothai is from Sanskrit sukha (सुख "happiness") + udaya (उदय "rise, emergence"), meaning "dawn of happiness". Founded in 1238, it is about 427 km north of Bangkok. Sukhothai was the capital of the Thai Empire for approximately 140 years. As of 2014, 193 temples have been excavated and partly reconstructed.

The stele of Ram Khamhaeng states the city had a triple wall and four gates.  At its center was a pond, a "marvelous pond of clear and delicious water like the water of the Mekong in the dry season."  The Aranyika monastery was west of the city, a great lake to the east, a market to the north, and the Khao Luang hill to the south.

Old Sukhothai is a quiet town with almost no hotels. Most visitors stay in New Sukhothai. Others stay in the nearby city of Phitsanulok, which has numerous hotels and restaurants and is on the rail line between Bangkok and Chiang Mai.

Sukhothai occupies an area of 6,596 km2. The historic town of Sukhothai and related areas were designated a UNESCO World Heritage site in 1991.

References

External links

Geography of Sukhothai province
Cities and towns in Thailand
Capitals of former nations